Microthyris prolongalis is a moth in the family Crambidae. It was described by Achille Guenée in 1854. It is found in Brazil, the West Indies (Jamaica, the Dominican Republic, Puerto Rico, Cuba), Costa Rica, Panama, Belize, Honduras, Mexico, Texas and Florida.

The wingspan is about 33 mm. Adults are on wing in June, October and December in Florida.

The larvae have been recorded feeding on Ipomea species.

References

Moths described in 1854
Spilomelinae